Sometimes Aunt Martha Does Dreadful Things is a 1971 cult film written, produced, and directed by Thomas Casey.

Set in Miami, and shot at the now closed Moberly Studios in Hollywood, Florida, the story centers around two criminals, Stanley (Wayne Crawford under the name Scott Lawrence) and Paul, played by Abe Zwick, who, because of their criminal history in Baltimore, have decided to lie low in a Miami suburb. They hatch a plan that involves Paul in drag. He wears wigs, women's blouses, skirts, and sensible shoes to pose as Stanley's "Aunt Martha."

An implicit homosexual relationship ostensibly exists between Paul and Stanley. Stanley is shown in the company of several girls.  Aunt Martha is not heartened by them  and forbids Stanley to see them.  Stanley and Aunt Martha  argue constantly with Martha expressing a great deal of dissatisfaction with Stanley's lifestyle. Stanley seems to have no real direction in his life beyond hallucinogenic drugs and becoming terrified and hysterical when "far out chicks" start unbuckling his pants. When he gets absurdly high, usually by his drugged out friend Jerry, played by Jessie Eastland, he tends to become violently agitated.

Cast
 Abe Zwick as Paul
 Wayne Crawford as Stanley (as Scott Lawrence)
 Don Craig as Hubert
 Robin Hughes as Vicki
 Yanka Mann as Mrs. Adams
 Marty Cordova as Alma
 Maggie Wood as Dolores
 Mike Mingoia as Joe
 Jessie Eastland as Jerry (as Robert De Meo)
 Sandra Lurie as Mary Lou

Reception
The TLA Video and DVD guide gave the film one star, stating that it is full of stereotypes, but is "good for a laugh." Raymond Murry stated that "Gay relationships don't come any sicker than in this enjoyably bizarre drive-in slasher-cum-camp pic."

References

External links
 

1971 films
1970s crime thriller films
American crime thriller films
American independent films
American LGBT-related films
Cross-dressing in American films
1970s exploitation films
Films set in Florida
Films shot in Florida
American serial killer films
1971 LGBT-related films
1971 independent films
1970s English-language films
1970s American films